Zhang Ran (born 15 April 1999) is a Chinese footballer currently playing as a defender for Beijing BSU.

Career statistics

Club
.

References

1999 births
Living people
Chinese footballers
Association football defenders
China League One players
Beijing Guoan F.C. players
Beijing Sport University F.C. players